Caudatoscelis is a genus of mantis in the family Amorphoscelididae; species are found in West Africa.

Species
The following species are recognised in the genus Caudatoscelis:
 Caudatoscelis annulipes Karsch, 1892
 Caudatoscelis caudata (Giglio-Tos, 1914) - type species
 Caudatoscelis collarti Roy, 1964
 Caudatoscelis lagrecai Roy, 1964
 Caudatoscelis marmorata Roy, 1965

See also
List of mantis genera and species

References

 
Mantodea genera